Victoria Mahoney is an American actress and filmmaker. Her debut feature was 2011’s Yelling to the Sky.

Career

Directing career 

Victoria Mahoney made her feature directing debut in 2011 with the semi-autobiographical film Yelling to the Sky. The film follows a young girl’s struggle in high school and her difficult home life. The film, starred Zoe Kravitz as a troubled teen and Jason Clarke as her father, debuted in competition at the 61st Berlin International Film Festival. She developed the script through the help of the Directors and Screenwriters Sundance Institute Labs and was awarded the title of Auerbach Screenwriting Fellow, Annerberg Film Fellow, Cinereach Fellow, Maryland Fellow, IFP Narrative Lab fellow and a Tribeca Film Fellow. The film was written and directed by Victoria Mahoney. The film received credit from the 61st Berlin International Film Festival and the Golden Bear. Victoria was the first woman director/writer, American invited in over sixty years to the Golden Bear competition. Variety praised the film saying it had a strong directional voice and stated that Mahoney had a clear driven and genuine creative gift.  Victoria entered the film into multiple film festivals across the world before releasing theatrically in late 2012.

In an interview with the Tribeca Film Institute, Mahoney reveals what she wants people to take away from her films saying, “The level of ‘take away’ exists on such a case by case basis. It all depends on what an audience member is experiencing and investigating in their own life. My overriding intentions as a filmmaker, is to tap into individual inquiries and reflect-whatever is hidden. Inspiring an audience’s need for further inquiry into whatever stories, wishes, wants, hungers, desires, questions or aches-presently propel them. From my filmmaking, I’d love audiences to receive some measure of inspiration; to investigate the human condition.”

In 2013, she was nominated for the inaugural Tribeca Film Institute's Heineken Affinity Award's $20,000 prize, but lost to her friend and colleague Ava DuVernay. In the same year, she directed a short film starring Selena Gomez and Shiloh Fernandez for Flaunt.

Mahoney was selected to direct second unit on Star Wars: The Rise of Skywalker, marking her as the first woman to direct on a STAR WARS film in the franchise's forty year history.

In 2020, Amazon Studios announced that Mahoney would be team up with Ava DuVernay to adapt Octavia E. Butler’s sci-fi novel Dawn.

In 2021, Netflix announced that Mahoney would take over directing duties from Gina Prince-Bythewood as director for The Old Guard 2.

Acting career 

Throughout the 1990s and early 2000s Mahoney worked as an actress appearing in Seinfeld and the movie Legally Blonde.

In 1992 she starred as "Antinea" in the French film L'Atlantide, based on the French novel "Atlantida" by Pierre Benoit.

Her most recent appearance in front of the camera was a brief cameo in Ava DuVernay's short film Say Yes in 2013.

Filmography
Film

Short films

Television

References
 
http://www.ioncinema.com/news/festival-predictions/2016-sundance-victoria-mahoney-chalk-rx
http://www.sundance.org/festivals/sundance-film-festival 
https://tribecafilminstitute.org/blog/detail/heineken_affinity_award_profile_victoria_mahoney

External links
 

Living people
African-American film directors
African-American screenwriters
American screenwriters
American film directors
American women film directors
American women television directors
American television directors
Year of birth missing (living people)
21st-century African-American people
21st-century African-American women